Chełm is a city in Lublin Voivodeship, eastern Poland.

Chełm may also refer to the following places in Poland:

Chełm County, Lublin Voivodeship
Chełm, part of the Zwierzyniec district of Kraków
Chełm, Bochnia County in Lesser Poland Voivodeship (southern Poland)
Chełm, Olkusz County in Lesser Poland Voivodeship (southern Poland)
Chełm, Lubin County in Lower Silesian Voivodeship (south-west Poland)
Chełm, Środa Śląska County in Lower Silesian Voivodeship (south-west Poland)
Chełm, Warmian-Masurian Voivodeship (northern Poland)
Chełm, Gdańsk, district of the city of Gdańsk

Chełm may also refer to:
Chełm (parliamentary constituency), a parliamentary constituency in Poland
Jewish humour#Chełm - a legendary Jewish town of foolish persons

See also

 
 
 
 KELM (disambiguation)